The Metro Atlantic Athletic Conference (MAAC) Men's Basketball Player of the Year is a basketball award given to the men's basketball player in the Metro Atlantic Athletic Conference (MAAC) voted as the most outstanding player. The award was first presented following the 1981–82 season, the first MAAC season, through voting by the league's head coaches. The award was first given to William Brown of Saint Peter's in 1982 after Brown averaged 17.0 ppg, while leading the Peacocks to the NIT. 

Lionel Simmons of La Salle won the award a league record three times in his career. Simmons, along with winning his third MAAC Player of the Year award, was also the consensus national player of the year in 1990. As of 2023, three players have won the award twice in their career: Steve Burtt of Iona, Luis Flores of Manhattan and Justin Robinson of Monmouth.

There has been one tie in the award's history, in 2017–18 when the award was shared between the two MAAC Buffalo based schools, with Jermaine Crumpton of Canisius and Kahlil Dukes of Niagara both sharing the honors. Iona has produced the most players in the league to win the award with 10. Siena is a close second, with seven players winning. The only current MAAC member without a winner is Mount St. Mary's, which joined the MAAC in 2022–23.

Key

Winners

Winners by school

Footnotes

See also
 Metro Atlantic Athletic Conference Men's Basketball Coach of the Year

References
General

Specific

NCAA Division I men's basketball conference players of the year
Player of the Year
Awards established in 1982
1982 establishments in the United States